Abram Edelman may refer to:
 Abram M. Edelman, American architect
 Abram Wolf Edelman, Polish-born American rabbi